Koro-ni-O is a village in Fiji, noted as the centre of the country's hydroelectric industry.  The Monasavu Dam hydroelectric scheme, built between 1978 and 1983, features an 82-meter high earthen dam on the Nanuka River.  A 5.4-kilometer long tunnel joins the Wailoa River Power Station to the dam, 625 meters above. At F$234 million, it was the most expensive project ever initiated by the Fijian government.  The river has an accompanying lake, one of two in Fiji.

Populated places in Fiji
Ba Province